Perbrinckia gabadagei is a species of freshwater crabs of the family Gecarcinucidae that is endemic to Sri Lanka. The species was once categorized as vulnerable by founders, but now considered to be critically endangered and probably extinct due to lack of recent evidences since 1996. The species first found from Adam's Peak area. It is very rarely found, and known to live under moist soil, and near water sources.

References

Gecarcinucoidea
Freshwater crustaceans of Asia
Crustaceans of Sri Lanka
Endemic fauna of Sri Lanka
Crustaceans described in 2005